St Edmund's Priory, Cambridge was a priory in Cambridgeshire, England. It was established in 1291 and was dissolved in 1539.

References

Monasteries in Cambridgeshire
1291 establishments in England
Christian monasteries established in the 13th century
1539 disestablishments in England